Kirk R. Carlsen (born May 25, 1987, in Nashua, New Hampshire) is an American former professional cyclist, who competed professionally between 2010 and 2014. He grew up in New Hampshire, and among his best results include several European victories with the U.S. National Team, U.S. U23 National Champion in 2008, and best climber at the Redlands Classic in 2009. Before Garmin, Carlsen rode for Garmin's development program, the U.S. National Team, Rubicon, and Peerless Insurance Junior Cycling Team.

Carlsen joined the  squad for the 2014 season, after his previous team –  – folded at the end of the 2013 season. He retired after the 2014 season.

Major results

2008
 1st  Road race, National Under-23 Road Championships
 1st GP Ost-Fenster
 1st Mountains classification Redlands Classic
 1st Points classification Le Tour des Pays de Savoie
2009
 10th Eschborn-Frankfurt City Loop U23
2013
 1st Overall Sea Otter Classic
1st Stage 3
 7th Overall Tour de Beauce
2014
 4th Overall Tour of the Gila
 5th Overall Tour de Beauce

References

External links

1987 births
American male cyclists
Living people
Sportspeople from Nashua, New Hampshire
Cyclists from New Hampshire